The canton of Thénac is an administrative division of the Charente-Maritime department, western France. It was created at the French canton reorganisation which came into effect in March 2015. Its seat is in Thénac.

It consists of the following communes:

Berneuil
Brives-sur-Charente
Chermignac
La Clisse
Colombiers
Corme-Royal
Coulonges
Courcoury
Les Gonds
La Jard
Luchat
Montils
Pérignac
Pessines
Pisany
Préguillac
Rétaud
Rioux
Rouffiac
Saint-Sever-de-Saintonge
Salignac-sur-Charente
Tesson 
Thénac
Thézac
Varzay

References

Cantons of Charente-Maritime